Olympic Honeymoon is a 1940 British comedy film directed by Alfred J. Goulding and starring Claude Hulbert, Monty Banks and Princess Pearl. The screenplay concerns a British honeymooner visiting Switzerland, who is mistaken for a leading ice hockey player and is enlisted to play for the England national team. It was based on the novel He and Ski by F. Dawson Gratrix and is sometimes known by the alternative title Honeymoon Merry-Go-Round.

Partial cast
 Claude Hulbert - Bob Bennett
 Monty Banks - Orban
 Princess Pearl - Bunny
 Sally Gray - Miss America
 Tully Comber - Cosmo

References

External links

1940 films
1940 comedy films
Films directed by Alfred J. Goulding
British comedy films
British black-and-white films
1940s English-language films
1940s British films